The  is a railway line in Japan operated by the East Japan Railway Company (JR East).

Basic data

Official definition
Operators, distances: 
East Japan Railway Company (JR East) (Services and tracks)
Ōfuna — Kurihama: 
Japan Freight Railway Company (JR Freight) (Services)
Ōfuna — Zushi: 
Double-tracked section: Ōfuna – Yokosuka
Railway signalling: Centralized Traffic Control (CTC)

Route as operated by JR East
Tokyo — Kurihama: 
Double-tracked section: Tokyo – Yokosuka
Railway signalling: Centralized Traffic Control (CTC)
Maximum speed:

Route
The Yokosuka Line runs underground between Tokyo and Shinagawa (parallel to the Tōkaidō Main Line, the Yamanote Line and the Keihin-Tōhoku Line) then branches to the west along the Tōkaidō Shinkansen into the city of Kawasaki. (This alignment, technically known as the Hinkaku Line(), was originally built for freight usage; see below.) It rejoins the Tōkaidō Main Line corridor near Tsurumi Station and follows the Tōkaidō Main Line to Ōfuna, where it branches off to the southeast along the original Yokosuka Line toward the Miura Peninsula.

Services
Yokosuka Line local trains make all stops. Most trains have 11 cars, with two of those being Green (first class) cars. Other trains between Tokyo and Zushi are made up of 15 cars—an 11-car set joined to a 4-car set. (Due to shorter platform length at stations south of Zushi, only 11-car trains are operated to Kurihama.) Some day-time trains operate between Zushi and Kurihama and these trains are made up of 4-car set without Green Cars.

Shōnan-Shinjuku Line trains enter or exit the Yokosuka Line at Nishi-Ōi. Utsunomiya–Yokosuka Line through services make all stops on the Yokosuka Line between Nishi-Ōi and Zushi, while Takasaki–Tōkaidō Line through services operate Rapid service within the Yokosuka Line, between Nishi-Ōi and Ōfuna, skipping Nishi-Ōi, Shin-Kawasaki, Hodogaya and Higashi-Totsuka.

For information on the Narita Express and other limited express services, see their respective articles.

Some trains travel as far as:
  on the Sotobō Line
  on the Uchibō Line
  via  on the Narita Line 
  on the Kashima Line
  on the Sōbu Main Line

Station list 
The section between Yokosuka and Kurihama is single-tracked; trains can only pass one another at Kinugasa and Kurihama stations.

Local trains stop at all stations, from Tokyo to Kurihama. Meanwhile, Shōnan–Shinjuku Line (Utsunomiya–Yokosuka Line) stop at all stations between Nishi-Ōi and Zushi.

Shōnan–Shinjuku Line (Takasaki–Tōkaidō Line) operate Rapid service on the Yokosuka Line.

Legends:

 ● : Trains stop
 | : Trains pass
 ▲ : Shōnan–Shinjuku Line (Takasaki–Tōkaidō Line) trains use Tōkaidō Line platforms

Rolling stock 
 Yokosuka Line (through service to the Sōbu Rapid Line) 
 E217 series (from December 1994)
 E235-1000 series (from 21 December 2020)
 E233 series E233-3000 series (from March 2015)
 211 series (from April 1992 - 2012)   Shōnan-Shinjuku Line through service 

History
The Yokosuka Line was constructed in response to the request to the Cabinet by the Navy and the Army, dated June 22, 1886, citing the lack of ground transportation to Yokosuka, one of the most important military bases in the country. On April 22, 1887 the Cabinet ordered the Government Railways to build the line with the budget diverted from the fund for the Tōkaidō Line construction. After the survey from July to December 1887, the construction of the railway between Ōfuna and Yokosuka started in January 1888 and completed in June 1889 spending 408,480 yen in total. The operation of the line started on June 16, 1889.

Chronology

 16 June 1889: Line opens between Ōfuna and Yokosuka with intermediate stations at Kamakura and Zushi
 1 April 1895: Line becomes part of the Tōkaidō Line
 1 May 1904: Taura Station opens
 12 October 1909: Line renamed the Yokosuka Line
 12 August 1914: Line doubled-tracked between Zushi and Numama Signal Box (newly built between Zushi and Taura)
 13 September 1916: Line doubled-tracked between Ōfuna and Kamakura
 March 1917: Line doubled-tracked between Kamakura and Zushi
 20 October 1920: Line doubled-tracked between Numama Signal Box and Taura
 25 December 1924: Line doubled-tracked between Taura and Yokosuka
 23 December 1925: Entire line electrified; electric locomotives begin operation between Tokyo and Yokosuka
 20 May 1927: Kita-Kamakura Station (temporary) opens
 15 March 1930: Service with electric multiple units (EMU) begins
 1 October 1930: Kita-Kamakura Station becomes a permanent station
 1 April 1944: Line was extended to Kurihama; Kinugasa Station opens
 April–August 1945: Sagami-Kanaya Station (temporary) is operated to serve a military base between Yokosuka and Kinugasa
 1 April 1952: Higashi-Zushi Station opens
 16 June 1968: Luggage on a Yokosuka Line train exploded near Ōfuna Station, killing one and injuring 14. The culprit, a man in his 20s, testified that he had not meant to kill anyone, but to frighten his ex-fiancée, who had left him for an acquaintance; however, he was ultimately convicted and sentenced to death.
 1 October 1974: Freight service abolished between Yokosuka and Kurihama
 1 October 1976: New double-tracked underground line between Tokyo and Shinagawa opens; Sōbu Line (Rapid) trains terminate at Shinagawa
 1 October 1980: Separated Tōkaidō Line tracks between Tokyo and Ōfuna opened for Yokosuka Line service; Shin-Kawasaki, Higashi-Totsuka stations open; Hodogaya Station served only by Yokosuka Line trains
 1 February 1984: Freight service abolished between Yokosuka and Zushi
 2 April 1986: Nishi-Ōi station opens
 2 May 1998: Through service to Zushi from the Yokohama and Negishi lines are operated on weekends and holidays
 1 December 2001: Shōnan-Shinjuku Line begins operation
 16 October 2004: Major revision of Shōnan-Shinjuku Line services; Shinjuku-terminating trains abolished
 1 May 2006: JR Freight ceases operations between Taura and Zushi
 15 March 2008: Weekend/holiday through service to Zushi from the Yokohama and Negishi lines is abolished; new Yokosuka Line platform installed at Shinagawa Station
 13 March 2010: Yokosuka Line service at Musashi-Kosugi Station commences
 13 March 2015: Ohayō Liner Zushi and Home Liner Zushi are discontinued.
 20 August 2016: Station numbering was introduce with stations being assigned station numbers between JO01 and JO19. Numbers increase towards in the northbound direction towards Tokyo.
 17 March 2018: Airport Narita'' services are discontinued.

Hinkaku Line
After a 1967 explosion, freight trains were banned from portions of the central Tokyo rail network, providing the impetus for the construction of the orbital Musashino Line. The new Musashino Line was connected to the Hinkaku Line roughly 6 km north of Tsurumi Station near , siphoning off nearly all freight traffic after its opening in 1975. This left a substantial chunk of the double-tracked, mostly grade-separated Hinkaku Line disused.

In order to put the line back into passenger service, a new 6 km track was installed between Tsurumi Station and the Musashino Line, where it was connected to the now-disused portion of the Hinkaku Line. Musashi-Kosugi Station, the third station in this section opened in 2010 and provides a transfer to the Nambu Line as well as the Tōkyū Tōyoko and Meguro lines.

See also
 Sōbu Line (Rapid)

References

External links

 Stations of the Yokosuka Line (JR East) 

 
Lines of East Japan Railway Company
Railway lines in Tokyo
Railway lines in Kanagawa Prefecture
1067 mm gauge railways in Japan
Railway lines opened in 1889